"The Next Village" (German: "Das nächste Dorf") is a short story by Franz Kafka written between 1917 and 1923. The story presents a grandfather's comment that life is too short even to get to the neighbouring village.

References
 Kafka, Franz. The Complete Stories. New York City: Schocken Books, 1995.

Short stories by Franz Kafka
1923 short stories